Simone Christensen (born 10 February 1994) is a Danish female  BMX rider, representing her nation at international competitions. She won the gold medal in the women's event at the 2015 European Games. She competed in the time trial event and race event at the 2015 UCI BMX World Championships. She won a silver medal in the 2018 European BMX Championships.

References

External links
 
 
 
 

1994 births
Living people
BMX riders
Danish female cyclists
Olympic cyclists of Denmark
Cyclists at the 2016 Summer Olympics
Cyclists at the 2020 Summer Olympics
European Games medalists in cycling
European Games gold medalists for Denmark
Cyclists at the 2015 European Games
Place of birth missing (living people)
21st-century Danish women